Youghal was a United Kingdom Parliament constituency in Ireland returning one MP. It was an original constituency represented in Parliament when the Union of Great Britain and Ireland took effect on 1 January 1801.

Boundaries
This constituency was the parliamentary borough of Youghal in County Cork. A Topographical Directory of Ireland, published in 1837, describes the Parliamentary history of the borough.

The new boundary of 1832, contained in the Parliamentary Boundaries (Ireland) Act 1832 was:

Members of Parliament

Elections

Elections in the 1830s

Ponsonby was appointed as a Lord Commissioner of the Treasury, requiring a by-election.

 Davis resigned on the second day of polling

Elections in the 1840s

Elections in the 1850s

Elections in the 1860s

On petition, Weguelin was unseated due to treating, and a by-election was called.

Elections in the 1870s

Elections in the 1880s

Notes

Further reading
The Parliaments of England by Henry Stooks Smith (1st edition published in three volumes 1844–50), 2nd edition edited (in one volume) by F.W.S. Craig (Political Reference Publications 1973)

Part of the Library Ireland: Irish History and Culture website containing the text of A Topographical Directory of Ireland, by Samuel Lewis (a work published by S. Lewis & Co of London in 1837) including an article on Youghal

Westminster constituencies in County Cork (historic)
Constituencies of the Parliament of the United Kingdom established in 1801
Constituencies of the Parliament of the United Kingdom disestablished in 1885
Youghal